Muthuvallur  is a gampanchayat in Malappuram district in the state of Kerala, India. This panchayat is detached from Cheekkode gramapanchayat.

Location
Muthuvallur is located on the north of Kondotty town. it is on the main road from Kondotty to Edavannappara.

Suburbs and Villages

 Mundilakkal

 Mundakkulam

 Vilayil
 Muthuvallur
 Muthuparamba
 Parathakkad
 Moochikkal
 West Moochikkal
 Vettukad
 Kangadi
 Chemmalaparamba
 Chullikkode

Demographics
 India census, Muthuvallur had a population of 31157 with 15298 males and 15859 females.

Transportation
Muthuvallur village connects to other parts of India through Feroke town on the west and Nilambur town on the east.  National highway No.66 passes through Pulikkal and the northern stretch connects to Goa and Mumbai.  The southern stretch connects to Cochin and Trivandrum.  State Highway No.28 starts from Nilambur and connects to Ooty, Mysore and Bangalore through Highways.12,29 and 181. The nearest airport is at Kozhikode.  The nearest major railway station is at Feroke.

References

Villages in Malappuram district
Kondotty area